Rubus setosus, the bristly blackberry, is a North American species of flowering plant in the rose family. It is widespread in much of central and eastern Canada (from Ontario to Newfoundland) and the northeastern and north-central United States (from New England west to Minnesota and south as far as North Carolina)

Leaves are palmately compound with 3 or 5 leaflets. Flowers are white. Fruit is black, nearly spherical.

The genetics of Rubus is extremely complex, so that it is difficult to decide on which groups should be recognized as species. There are many rare species with limited ranges such as this. Further study is suggested to clarify the taxonomy.

References

External links
 
 
 Michigan Flora

setosus
Plants described in 1824
Flora of North America